Sant'Agostino is a former Gothic-style church in Padua, region of Veneto, Italy. It was razed to the ground in 1819 by the Austrian authorities to construct a military hospital.

History
This large church, and its adjacent Dominican order convent, was located next to the Ponte di Sant'Agostino. It was described by the historian Pietro Selvatico as "without doubt the most beautiful medieval building in Padua after the Basilica di Sant'Antonio". In structure, it resembled San Nicolo in Treviso.

The architect was Leonardo Murario, called il Rocalica, and was built between 1226 and 1275 under the patronage of Nicolò di Boccassio, Bishop of Padua and future pope Benedict XI. Many members of the Carrara family, lords of Padua during 1318 to 1405, were buried here. Their tombs were moved to the church of the Eremitani prior to demolition. Some of the columns were reused by the architect Giuseppe Jappelli, in the building now used by the Liceo Artistico Pietro Selvatico. The building is now the caserma Piave, where a fragment of a fresco by Guariento, originally in the church was discovered.

References

13th-century Roman Catholic church buildings in Italy
Roman Catholic churches in Padua
1226 establishments in Europe
13th-century establishments in Italy
Churches completed in 1275
Gothic architecture in Veneto